Nông Đức Mạnh (born 11 September 1940) is a Vietnamese politician who served as General Secretary of the Communist Party of Vietnam, the most powerful position in the Socialist Republic of Vietnam, from 22 April 2001 to 19 January 2011. His parents were Tày peasants. Nông Đức Mạnh was born in Cường Lợi, Na Rì District, Bắc Kạn Province. His own son is Nông Quốc Tuấn, party secretary for Bắc Giang Province.

Background
It has long been rumoured that Nông Đức Mạnh is the illegitimate son of Hồ Chí Minh (1890–1969) and Nông Thị Trưng (1921–2003), Hồ's housekeeper from 1941–42. This story may have been a factor in his selection as party leader. In a profile of Mạnh published in the official press immediately after he gained this position, Trưng was identified as his mother.

Nông Đức Mạnh's official biography gives his date of birth as 11 September 1940 and he was born to a peasant family from the Tày ethnic minority when Hồ Chí Minh was still in China. Ho returned to Vietnam in February 1941 and met Trưng in July. Hồ wrote a four-line poem for Trưng in 1944, and gave her a notebook as "a token of my love".

This poem was later taught to elementary school students. In April 2001, shortly after Nông Đức Mạnh was named as General Secretary of the Communist Party of Vietnam , a reporter at a news conference asked him to confirm or deny the rumor. He responded, "All Vietnamese people are the children of Uncle Hồ." When asked again about the rumor in January 2002 by a Time Asia reporter, he denied he was Hồ's son and stated that his father was named Nông Văn Lại and his mother Hoàng Thị Nhị.

Early life and political career
In 1958–61, Nông Đức Mạnh attended the Hanoi Higher School. From 1962–63, he worked as a forestry supervisory technician in the Bắc Kạn Forestry Service. He joined the Communist Party on 5 July 1963 and received full membership on 10 July 1964. From 1963–65, Mạnh was the deputy chief of the Bạch Thông wood exploitation  team; he later returned to his studies, learning Russian at the Hanoi Foreign Languages College (from 1965–66). He traveled to Leningrad, where he studied at the Forestry Institute until 1971. After returning to Vietnam, he became the deputy head of the Bắc Thái provincial forestry inspection board.

From 1973–74, Nông Đức Mạnh served as director of the Phú Lương State Forestry Camp in Bắc Thái province. From 1974–76, he studied at the Nguyễn Ái Quốc High-Level Party School. From 1976–80, he served as the deputy director of the provincial forestry service and director of the construction company of the provincial forestry service. Rising through the party ranks, Mạnh was a member of the Bắc Thái Provincial Party Committee from 1976–83. In 1984, he was named deputy secretary of the committee, and in November 1986, the secretary of the committee. At the 6th National Congress he was elected as an alternate member of the Central Committee. At the sixth party plenum in March 1989, he was elevated to full central committee member. Since 1991, he has been in the politburo. From 23 September 1992, he was Chairman of the National Assembly of Vietnam, thereby being one of the youngest when standing on the stage of honor of a Chairman of the National Assembly of Vietnam.

Nông Đức Mạnh was selected General Secretary of the Communist Party in April 2001. His term was renewed in April 2006. He retired on 19 January 2011 after 11th National Congress of the Communist Party of Vietnam. He is the first Vietnamese party head with a university degree. He announced his plans for Vietnam's future as an industrialised country, to be completed by 2020.

References

1940 births
People from Bắc Kạn province
Tày people
Chairmen of the Standing Committee of the National Assembly (Vietnam)
Vietnamese expatriates in the Soviet Union
Saint-Petersburg State Forestry University alumni
Living people
General Secretaries of the Central Committee of the Communist Party of Vietnam
Members of the 7th Politburo of the Communist Party of Vietnam
Members of the Standing Committee of the 8th Politburo of the Communist Party of Vietnam
Members of the 8th Politburo of the Communist Party of Vietnam
Members of the 9th Politburo of the Communist Party of Vietnam
Members of the 10th Politburo of the Communist Party of Vietnam
Members of the 9th Secretariat of the Communist Party of Vietnam
Members of the 10th Secretariat of the Communist Party of Vietnam
Alternates of the 6th Central Committee of the Communist Party of Vietnam
Members of the 6th Central Committee of the Communist Party of Vietnam
Members of the 7th Central Committee of the Communist Party of Vietnam
Members of the 8th Central Committee of the Communist Party of Vietnam
Members of the 9th Central Committee of the Communist Party of Vietnam
Members of the 10th Central Committee of the Communist Party of Vietnam
Ho Chi Minh